Céa's lemma is a lemma in mathematics. Introduced by Jean Céa in his Ph.D. dissertation, it is an important tool for proving error estimates for the finite element method applied to elliptic partial differential equations.

Lemma statement
Let  be a real Hilbert space with the norm  Let  be a bilinear form with the  properties

Let  be a bounded linear operator. Consider the problem of finding an element  in  such that

  for all  in 

Consider the same problem on a finite-dimensional subspace  of  so,  in  satisfies

  for all  in 

By the Lax–Milgram theorem, each of these problems has exactly one solution. Céa's lemma states that

   for all  in 

The proof is straightforward 
   for all  in 
 
which follows directly from  

Note: Céa's lemma holds on complex Hilbert spaces also, one then uses a  sesquilinear form  instead of a bilinear one.

Error estimate in the energy norm

In many applications, the bilinear form  is symmetric, so

  for all  in 

This, together with the above properties of this form, implies that   is an inner product on  The resulting norm

 

is called the energy norm, since it corresponds to a physical energy in many problems. This norm is equivalent to the original norm 

Hence, in the energy norm, the inequality in Céa's lemma becomes

   for all  in 

(notice that the constant  on the right-hand side is no longer present).

This states that the subspace solution  is the best approximation to the full-space solution  in respect to the energy norm. Geometrically, this means that  is the projection of the solution  onto the subspace  in respect to the inner product  (see the adjacent picture).

Using this result, one can also derive a sharper estimate in the norm . Since
it follows that

An application of Céa's lemma
We will apply Céa's lemma to estimate the error of calculating the solution to an elliptic differential equation by the finite element method.

Consider the problem of finding a function  satisfying the conditions 

where  is a given continuous function.

For example, that force may be the gravity, when  is a constant function (since the gravitational force is the same at all points).

with

 ,

and

It can be shown that the bilinear form  and the operator  satisfy the assumptions of Céa's lemma.

In order to determine a finite-dimensional subspace  of  consider a partition

of the interval  and let  be the space of all continuous functions that are affine on each subinterval in the partition (such functions are called piecewise-linear).

Let  be the solution to the subspace problem

  for all  in 

   for all  in 

It can be shown using Taylor's theorem that there exists a constant  that depends only on the endpoints  and  such that

 

for all  in  where  is the largest length of the subintervals  in the partition, and the norm on the right-hand side is the L2 norm.

This inequality then yields an estimate for the error

 

Then, by substituting  in Céa's lemma it follows that

 

where  is a different constant from the above (it depends only on the bilinear form, which implicitly depends on the interval ).

References

 (Original work from J. Céa)

 
 

Numerical differential equations
Hilbert space
Lemmas in analysis